WTNJ (105.9 FM) is a country formatted broadcast radio station licensed to Mount Hope, West Virginia, serving the Beckley/Oak Hill/Charleston area.  WTNJ is owned and operated by Southern Communications.

Call letters' history
In 1933, the call letters WTNJ were assigned to a Trenton, New Jersey, station previously known as WOAX.

References

External links
 
 

TNJ
Radio stations established in 1980
1980 establishments in West Virginia